Although South Africa participated in the Africa Cup of Nations much later than many African countries (the country was scheduled to participate in inaugural 1957 Africa Cup of Nations but was excluded because of apartheid), as they participated for the first time as host of 1996 edition, South Africa has soon established itself as an emerging African power. The first edition South Africa participated was a complete success, with the team conquered their first, and only African trophy, on their debut. Since then, South Africa continues to participate and remains a reckoned force, though success has been elusive since the 2000s. Outside the 1996 edition, South Africa also hosted 2013 Africa Cup of Nations and managed to advance to the quarter-finals. They again reached the quarter-finals in the 2019 edition of the tournament.

Record

*Red border color indicates tournament was held on home soil.

Match history

Top goalscorers

Phil Masinga is the first player to score for South Africa at Africa Cup of Nations (1996).
Benni McCarthy is the first and only player to score hat-trick for South Africa at Africa Cup of Nations (1998).

Squads

1996 Africa Cup of Nations squad
1998 Africa Cup of Nations squad
2000 Africa Cup of Nations squad
2002 Africa Cup of Nations squad
2004 Africa Cup of Nations squad
2006 Africa Cup of Nations squad
2008 Africa Cup of Nations squad
2013 Africa Cup of Nations squad
2015 Africa Cup of Nations squad
2019 Africa Cup of Nations squad

References

External links
Africa Cup of Nations – Archives competitions – cafonline.com

 
South Africa national soccer team